Plight & Premonition is the first of two collaborative albums by English musician David Sylvian and German musician Holger Czukay. It was released in March 1988.

Czukay had come to prominence in the 1960s with the experimental rock group Can, while Sylvian was the former the frontman of the UK new wave group Japan before embarking on a solo career.

The music on Plight & Premonition is ambient, making extensive use of 'found sounds' from a variety of non-traditional sources. It consists of two instrumental tracks, both of which are over 15 minutes long. The album peaked at no.71 in the UK albums chart.

Although recorded late in 1986, Sylvian and Czukay completed Premonition together quite soon after the session in February 1987. The compositions were not released until March 1988 by the low budget subsidiary of Virgin that specialised in experimental compositions, Venture Records. 

The tracks were later remixed by Sylvian and issued on a limited bonus disc with his 2002 compilation album Camphor. These remixes were used for a 2018 re-release by Grönland Records of a double album set combining this album and Flux + Mutability, their subsequent 1989 release.

Background

Sylvian said about the album 2012:

Track listing
"Plight (The Spiralling of Winter Ghosts)" – 18:30
"Premonition (Giant Empty Iron Vessel)" – 16:21

Personnel
David Sylvian – electric guitar, keyboards, piano, vibraphone, harmonium
Holger Czukay – organ, piano, shortwave radio, treatments
Jaki Liebezeit – infra sound
Karl Lippegaus – radio tuning

Album produced by David Sylvian and Holger Czukay.

Yuka Fujii – design, photography (assisted by Icon, London)
Mekon – artwork

References

External links
 Holger Czukay's discography
 David Sylvian On Collaborating With Holger Czukay

1988 debut albums
Holger Czukay albums
David Sylvian albums
Virgin Records albums